The 1978 South African Open was a men's tennis tournament played on outdoor hard courts in Johannesburg, South Africa that was part of the 1978 Colgate-Palmolive Grand Prix circuit. It was the 75th edition of the tournament and was held from 27 November through 4 December 1978. Second-seeded Tim Gullikson won the singles title.

Finals

Singles
 Tim Gullikson defeated  Harold Solomon 2–6, 7–6, 7–6, 6–7, 6–4

Doubles
 Peter Fleming /  Ray Moore defeated  Bob Hewitt /  Frew McMillan 6–3, 7–6

References

External links
 ITF – Johannesburg tournament details

South African Open
South African Open (tennis)
Open
Sports competitions in Johannesburg
1970s in Johannesburg
November 1978 sports events in Africa
December 1978 sports events in Africa